Bob and Mike Bryan were the two-time defending champions, but lost in the semifinals to Pierre-Hugues Herbert and Nicolas Mahut.

Herbert and Mahut went on to win the title, defeating Raven Klaasen and Rajeev Ram in the final, 5–7, 6–1, [10–7].

Seeds

Draw

Finals

Top half

Bottom half

References
 Main Draw

2016 Miami Open
Men in Florida